John Anthony Hardon, SJ (June 18, 1914 – December 30, 2000) was an American Jesuit priest, writer, and theologian. A candidate for sainthood since 2005, he is recognized by the Catholic Church as a Servant of God.

Early life 
John Anthony Hardon was born in 1914 to a devout Catholic family in Midland, Pennsylvania. When he was a year old, his 27-year-old father died in an industrial accident when the scaffolding collapsed under him as he moved to secure a steel beam dangling dangerously over his co-workers. After the accident Hardon was raised by his 26-year-old mother Anna (née Jevin) Hardon, who never remarried "out of concern for the influence a possible stepfather might have on her son's vocation." They moved to Cleveland, Ohio, where they lived "in the shadows of the iron and steel mills". John Janaro, a biographer of Hardon, described Anna as "a woman of deep faith, a Franciscan tertiary who embraced her poverty and her difficult circumstances with courage and grace." Anna "attended daily Mass and received Holy Communion" and her home "had sacred pictures, a family holy water font, and a good deal of spiritual conversation." The Hardons could not afford a telephone and seldom bought a newspaper. Hardon later recalled that they only spoke Slav at home and contrasted it favorably to English which he held was "the worst language in the world to try to talk Catholicism in."

Hardon was Anna's only child, and she supported him by cleaning offices in Cleveland, often working nights. Janaro reports that as a child Hardon was "willful and self-possessed; he was determined that no one was going to tell him what to do"; but he was soon affected by his mother's devoted example. Hardon would often recall that his mother told him that she "taught him to kneel before he could walk" and the very purpose of knees "are for kneeling to pray before God".
 
For added income Hardon's mother took in two young Lutheran girls as boarders named Judith and Susan, who lived with them for at least eight years. The three-year-old Hardon protested at having to abstain from meat on Friday while his boarder "sisters" could indulge. In response his mother asked the girls "My boy is growing up: he's asking embarrassing questions. Would you mind either abstaining from eating meat on Friday or find yourselves somewhere else to board?" The girls choose to join the fast with permission from their minister. These early companions who were "staunch Lutherans" helped to form his religious thinking: "Years before the Ecumenical Movement I had come to respect and cherish Protestants."

When he was four, Anna took him to his first all night vigil at Our Lady of Consolation parish in Carey, Ohio. She made a bed for him on the first pew, and prayed throughout the night on her knees as he slept. At the age of six he was instructed by a Sister Benedicta who told her students "Whatever you ask Our Lord on your First Communion day, you will receive." That same year as he received First Holy Communion Hardon made a request to Jesus, "Make me a priest." Thereafter the young Hardon attended daily Mass with his mother. At the age of eight he received the sacrament of Confirmation calling on the Holy Spirit to give him "the grace of martyrdom."

Early schooling 
Hardon was often at the top of his classes at St. Wendelin School. His ability to captivate a crowd was seen when he gave a one-man show to his sixth grade class entitled "Pockets" and "For one solid hour he kept the audience laughing with his explanations of what he carried in his pockets."

During a Church History class in eighth grade, Hardon became impressed with the Jesuit order while learing about St. Peter Canisius, a Jesuit priest in the 16th century who preached against the Protestant Reformation in Germany.

His mother did not have the funds to send him to a Jesuit boarding school, of which there were very few in the US, and there was no Jesuit high school near their home. He attended the diocesan high school, known as Cathedral Latin,  from his home. There he was taught by the Brothers of Mary.

Worrying about leaving his mother on her own, Hardon did not seriously consider the priesthood immediately after high school. Upon graduation "with the help of savings his mother had put aside specifically for his future" he attended John Carroll University, a Jesuit university in a suburb of Cleveland, commuting three to four hours daily.

Hardon intended to become a medical doctor; however, the Jesuit charism had a "profound impact" on him:

In his third year of studies, under the guidance of his Jesuit adviser LeMay, Hardon began to discern more clearly his own call to the priesthood, and he changed his course of studies to include Latin, philosophy, and college theology, earning his Bachelor of Arts degree from John Carrol University in 1936.

Entering the Jesuits 
Although he longed to join the Jesuits, Hardon felt a duty to look after his increasingly ill mother, and he considered marrying a girl named Jo who had been his friend since grade school. Beginning to doubt if he had a priestly vocation, but still desiring to serve others, he applied to and was accepted at Ohio State Medical School. Despite Hardon's doubts his spiritual adviser LeMay insisted that he "did indeed have a priestly vocation". His mother told him "the very same God who was calling him would guard every hair on his mother's head," and "if the reason he was going to marry was so that she would not be alone without anyone to care for her, he was not to be concerned." Hardon entered the Society of Jesus as a novice on September 1, 1936, "breaking the heart of a girl he loved, who loved him in return."

Hardon's health caused difficulties: "When I entered the Novitiate, in one month they put me in the hospital. I thought they were gonna throw me out of the order." He recovered and continued his studies.

When Hardon confessed to LeMay that he felt he had abandoned his mother, LeMay told him "John, you belong in the Society of Jesus. What you are experiencing is a temptation. Put it out of your
mind." Hardon continued regularly to correspond with his mother but to avoid temptation, he scrupulously avoided visiting her for seven years until ordered to do so by his superior. Hardon was deeply affected by the accidental drowning of a fellow seminarian on a summer lakeshore vacation, and he avoided vacations for the rest of his life.

Priesthood 
As a Jesuit novice, Hardon studied at West Baden College in West Baden Springs, Indiana. He published his first article in 1941 on the study of Latin. Worrying that his love of theology might lead him to pride, he "determined not to request further theological study; he would leave the determination of his future completely in the hands of the Holy Spirit." He obtained a master's degree in philosophy at Loyola University Chicago in 1941.

On June 18, 1947 (his 33rd birthday) Hardon was ordained to the priesthood with his mother in attendance, as well as the two Lutheran boarders of his childhood. Within a year of seeing her son enter the priesthood, Hardon's mother died.

Hardon took it as a sign of divine favor when his superiors, unprompted, chose for him the Pontifical Gregorian University in Rome to continue his study of theology (1949–1951). Appointed director of the graduate library, he was ordered to retrieve all of volumes on loan to other students that had been declared heretical. He recalled:

He received his Doctor of Sacred Theology degree from the Gregorian University in 1951 with a dissertation on St. Robert Bellarmine: A Comparative Study of Bellarmine's Doctrine on the Relation of Sincere Non-Catholics to the Catholic Church. Later in his life, he stated, "I could not have chosen a better subject in preparation for a lifetime of teaching Catholic doctrine." The same year, he received the Papal Medal.

Hardon's health problems, including asthma, forced his return to America in 1951, where he joined the faculty of West Baden College teaching theology to Jesuit students. Due to his health, he was denied his request to be a missionary to post-war Japan at the newly opened Jesuit University in Tokyo. Determined to foster this endeavor, Hardon began to study comparative religion. In oriental religions, he found "not only areas that were compatible with Christianity but also sections of thought that were clearly influenced in a direct manner by contact with the Christian message." Hardon began using his extensive knowledge of Asian customs and religions to train missionaries for the region.

Hardon pronounced his final vows on February 2, 1953, including the special Jesuit vow of unwavering fidelity to the pope.

His 1956 book Protestant Churches in America was met with critical acclaim even in Protestant circles. While still teaching full-time at West Baden, Hardon became a visiting professor of Catholic theology at several Protestant seminaries and colleges, including Bethany School of Theology, Lutheran School of Theology, and Seabury-Western Divinity School.

Upon his acceptance of a position at Seabury-Western Divinity school, the Anglican Archbishop of Canterbury sent a personal representative to mark "the first time in history an Anglican/Episcopalian seminary had appointed a teacher who was a member of the once hated and feared Society of Jesus." Hardon also served as an advisor to the Second Vatican Council in discussions on liturgy.

Between 1962 and 1967, Hardon taught Roman Catholicism and Comparative Religion at Western Michigan University. He released his book Religions of the World in 1963. By 1967 he returned to teaching Jesuit scholastics at two Jesuit theological schools in Illinois while working as a visiting professor at St. Paul University in Ottawa, where he taught furloughed missionaries classes in missiology. At this time he also began work for the Congregations for Religious and the Clergy in Rome to implement the renewal laid out in the documents of Vatican II.

In 1969 Hardon assisted in the founding of a union of religious called the Consortium Perfectae Caritatis. In 1971 he helped found the Institute on Religious Life. The same year he and nine other notable American Catholics were summoned by Camaldolese abbot Ugo Modotti on behalf of Pope Paul VI to create a Catholic media organization. Hardon told an interviewer this was because "the Holy Father's mission was very clear: American Catholics must get some control of the media of social communication; otherwise, the pope feared for the survival of the Church in our country." Upon Modotti's death, Hardon took over the mission.

In 1972, Hardon furthered his media apostolate by founding Mark Communications in Canada, and later the Pontifical Catechetical Institutes in the United States, to ensure the correct catechetical formation of religious educators. Hardon assisted and supported those establishing these organizations, especially Msgr. Eugene Kevane.

In 1974 Hardon became a professor at St. John's University in New York City at the Institute for Advanced Studies in Catholic Doctrine. He worked with the Sisters of Notre Dame of Chardon, Ohio to make Christ Our Life, a series of religious textbooks for elementary students.

Hardon's health problems continued throughout his life. In 1981 he had a quadruple bypass at a hospital in Chicago, his seventeenth hospitalization since joining the Jesuits.

Controversy 
Prompted by a woman's question at St. John's, Hardon wrote an article objecting to the Enneagram of Personality, viewing it as a New Age process dangerous to the Catholic faith. After being summoned to a consultation with his Jesuit superiors, he was informed he would be forbidden to teach at any Jesuit institution, a prohibition lasting sixteen years until his death. He viewed this as persecution for teaching the faith, a "white martyrdom", and he would advise his listeners that they should be willing to suffer for the true doctrines of Catholicism. Hardon was also rebuffed by the Archdiocese of Detroit, who refused to use any of his books in their catechetical materials or invite him to conferences and seminars. According to the conservative Catholic newspaper The Wanderer, a standing order at the Detroit archdiocese's newspaper The Michigan Catholic that Hardon's picture was not to be printed, and that his name was to be in the smallest font possible, due to Patrick Halfpenny's belief that "He's divisive." At the Detroit Mass celebrating the 50th anniversary of his ordination, not a single Jesuit joined him.

Father Donald J. McGuire investigation
On February 2, 1994 Mother Teresa wrote a letter to Father Bradley Schaeffer, the local Jesuit provincial, that she believed Father Donald McGuire was innocent of sex abuse allegations against him. McGuire was later convicted, sentenced to prison, and defrocked. Mother Teresa stated in her letter to Schaeffer that Father Hardon had explained "how he had established Father's innocence of the allegations against him. Hardon said that McGuire admitted imprudence in his behavior." In light of the later conviction and sentencing of Father McGuire, the role of Father Hardon in improperly exonerating Father McGuire been drawn into question.

Work 
Hardon wrote over forty books on religion and theology, including Catholic Catechism: A Contemporary Catechism of the Catholic Church (1975), a volume on Catholic orthodoxy; and the Modern Catholic Dictionary (1980), a Catholic reference work published after the Second Vatican Council (1962–1965). He also contributed to six encyclopedias.

Hardon had a close working relationship with Pope Paul VI, engaging in several initiatives at the Pope's request, including his authoring of The Catholic Catechism. Paul VI, apparently displeased with the controversial Dutch Catechism and in line with his letter Solemni Hac Liturgia (Credo of the people of God), requested that Hardon produce a volume in English to synthesize what Catholics must believe. At the time of his death, The Catholic Catechism had sold over 150,000 copies in hardback, and as a 623-page paperback had reached its 26th printing with over one million copies sold. It served as the official codified teaching of the Catholic Church until the 1992 Catechism of the Catholic Church promulgated by Pope John Paul II. Hardon also served as a consultant for the drafting of that document.

Hardon kept to a demanding work schedule, especially while assisting the 1992 Catechism. Once daily demands for his advice as a local spiritual director lessened around five or six pm, he would write and organize material and continue to work into the night (morning in Rome). During these hours he often received phone calls concerning details of the Catechism from Cardinal Ratzinger, who valued his advice.

Hardon had sympathy for those attracted to Catholic groups (such as the Society of St. Pius X) that strenuously objected to portions of Vatican II documents, "but he never for a moment accepted the premise that a schismatic act was ever justified."

Hardon was also a contributor to Catholic newspapers and magazines and was executive editor of The Catholic Faith magazine.

Hardon founded several Catholic organizations, which include Inter Mirifica (a name taken from Vatican II's decree on social communication), the Marian Catechists, and Holy Trinity Apostolate. He also served as an adviser to many Catholic organizations, including Catholics United for Faith.
	
Hardon participated in various apostolates to religious communities. In the early 1980s, Pope John Paul II instructed Mother Teresa of Calcutta to have her order evangelize the poor in addition to looking after their material needs. When she stated she did not know where to begin such an endeavor, the Pope referred her to Cardinal Ratzinger, who called upon Hardon to instruct her Missionaries of Charity. To fill this need for Mother Teresa's order, Hardon wrote a catechetical course which was adapted into home study courses for lay Catholics. In 1985 Hardon founded the Marian Catechist Apostolate, which uses these home study courses to provide catechetical formation to lay people to prepare them for catechetical ministry.

Hardon also assisted Catholic home schoolers, and worked with Eternal Life of Bardstown, Kentucky, where he recorded several audio lectures on Catholic topics beginning in 1988. His first series for Eternal Life was against contraception, which he viewed as what "greased the skids for the culture of death", the source for acceptance of abortion and assisted suicide, all of which are condemned by Catholicism. He recorded lectures on the Ignatian Exercises, the Apostles' Creed, the Eucharist, Catholic Sexual Morality, and Angels and Devils. Due to his halting voice, the recordings were digitally remastered.

He was known to be devoted to the Catholic practice of Eucharistic adoration, spending at least three hours a day praying before the Blessed Sacrament.

Hardon helped establish the "Call to Holiness" conference held annually near Detroit. The initial conference was held in the late 1990s to counter a nearby conference held the same weekend by the liberal Catholic group Call to Action. Hardon also played a key role in the conversion of the Protestant Dave Armstrong, who became a Catholic apologist.

Hardon spent his last years working from an office on the grounds of the Assumption Grotto in Detroit, serving as a spiritual director.

Possible beatification 
After suffering from several illnesses, Hardon died from bone cancer at the Jesuits' Colombiere Center in Clarkston, Michigan on December 30, 2000. William J. Smith reported that in his final weeks, Hardon "suffered tremendous physical pain, but he made himself 'a true victim soul.'" He bequeathed his extensive library and correspondence to Archbishop Raymond Burke. Each year, Catholics in the Detroit area celebrate a memorial Mass for Hardon on December 30.

There is interest among some Catholics for his canonization, and a Church-sanctioned prayer for that cause has been written. Cardinal Raymond Burke, then Archbishop of St. Louis and director of Hardon's Marian Catechist Apostolate, initiated Hardon's cause for canonization in 2005. Robert McDermott, a former student of Hardon's, was the postulator for the cause until moving to Kenosha, Wisconsin, where he serves as associate pastor at Our Lady of Mount Carmel Catholic Church. An effort is underway to establish a Father Hardon library and study center at the Shrine of Our Lady of Guadalupe in La Crosse, Wisconsin.

In early 2012, Peter Jamison in the San Francisco Weekly reported on documents concerning Hardon's fellow Jesuit Donald McGuire, who was arrested in 2005 and found guilty of sexually molesting boys. The article reported that years before the arrest, during a visit to Saint John Vianney, McGuire admitted to Hardon to taking showers with his alleged victim, asking the boy to massage his body, and allowing pornography in a shared room while traveling. McGuire denied additional allegations that he had touched the boy's genitals and watched him masturbate. Hardon was apparently satisfied, and wrote to Schaeffer, McGuire's superior: Regarding showering, Fr. Don said that it was true, but the picture is not one of a lingering sensual experience. It was rather the picture of two firemen, responding to an emergency, one of whom was seriously handicapped and in need of support and care from the other. . . . Regarding the massages, Fr. Don said they were done with attention to modesty and were necessary to relieve spasm at the 4th-5th lumbar disc [above the buttocks] and the right leg, involving the sciatic nerve. . . . Regarding pornography Fr. Don said that there were Playboy and Penthouse magazines, which he neither got nor threw away. . . . I do not believe there was any conscious and deliberate sexual perversity. . . . I do believe Fr. McGuire was acting on principles which, though objectively defensible, were highly imprudent. . . . He should be prudently allowed to engage in priestly ministry.According to the report, McGuire went on to abuse more children after returning to ministry. He was dismissed from the Jesuit order in 2007.

Writing for Catholic Culture author and editor Philip F. Lawler stated that "the toxic influence of the [sex abuse] scandal has seeped into yet another aspect of Catholic life, tarnishing the memory of potential saints." Holding Mother Teresa guiltless concerning the case of Donald McGuire, Lawler bemoaned "the same chain of evidence raises more serious questions about another beloved Catholic figure who is now a candidate for beatification: the late Father John Hardon, SJ." Lawler was perplexed asking "Once McGuire had admitted to some degree of misconduct, after earlier blanket denials, why was Father Hardon ready to accept his later denials of the more serious charges?" He noted "When informed about Father Hardon's role, Father Robert McDermott, the postulator for his cause for beatification, admitted to the San Francisco Weekly, 'I don’t know why he didn't take a harder line on this.' Lawler concluded "...the available evidence also sheds a very unflattering light on Father Hardon’s involvement. In the absence of some better explanation, it appears that his gross misjudgment had devastating consequences for the lives of several young boys—and perhaps for his cause for beatification as well."

Bibliography 
 All My Liberty
 The Treasury of Catholic Wisdom
 A Prophet for the Priesthood
 With Us Today: On the Real Presence of Jesus Christ in the Eucharist
 The History of Eucharistic Adoration
 Modern Catholic Dictionary
 Theology of Prayer
 Spiritual Life in the Modern World
 Salvation and Sanctification
 Holiness in the Church
 The Faith
 History and Theology of Grace: The Catholic Teaching on Divine Grace
 The Question and Answer Catholic Catechism, Doubleday, 1981. 
 The Catholic Catechism: A Contemporary Catechism of the Teachings of the Catholic Church, Doubleday, 1975. 
 Retreat with the Lord: A Popular Guide to the Spiritual Exercises of Ignatius of Loyola
 The Pocket Catechism, Doubleday, 1989. 
 The Pocket Catholic Dictionary: Abridged Edition of a Modern Catholic Dictionary, Doubleday, 1985. 
 The Catholic Lifetime Reading Plan
 Catholic Prayer book
 Marian Catechist Manual
 Christianity in the Twentieth Century, St. Paul Editions, 1977.
 Religions of the World

References 
Specific references

Other sources
 Tribute page

External links 
 List of on-line articles
 Father John Hardon, SJ Archive and Guild
 Modern Catholic Dictionary by Father John A. Hardon, S.J. - Reprinted by the website of the Real Presence Association (with the written permission of Eternal Life).

1914 births
2000 deaths
20th-century American Jesuits
American Roman Catholic religious writers
Catholicism-related controversies
American Servants of God
Loyola University Chicago alumni
John Carroll University alumni
History of Catholicism in Indiana
People from Clarkston, Michigan
20th-century American non-fiction writers
Religious leaders from Pennsylvania
Religious leaders from Ohio
Catholics from Michigan
20th-century venerated Christians